Dracaena konaensis, synonym Pleomele hawaiiensis, the Hawaii hala pepe, is a rare species of flowering plant that is endemic to the island of Hawaii in the state of Hawaii.

Associated plants include: ōhia lehua (Metrosideros polymorpha), lama (Diospyros sandwicensis), māmane (Sophora chrysophylla), alahee (Psydrax odorata), huehue (Cocculus orbiculatus), naio (Myoporum sandwicense), olopua (Nestegis sandwicensis), kuluī (Nototrichium sandwicense), ilima (Sida fallax), wiliwili (Erythrina sandwicensis), iliahi (Santalum spp.), ūlei (Osteomeles anthyllidifolia), uhiuhi (Caesalpinia kavaiensis), kauila (Colubrina oppositifolia), maola (Neraudia ovata), maiapilo (Capparis sandwichiana), Bidens micrantha ssp. ctenophylla, and aiea (Nothocestrum breviflorum).

There are 300 to 400 individuals remaining. It is an endangered species, threatened with habitat loss and modification.

The flowers of this plant were used in leis and the wood in carvings.

References

konaensis
Endemic flora of Hawaii
Biota of Hawaii (island)
Trees of Hawaii
Plants described in 1980
Taxonomy articles created by Polbot
Taxobox binomials not recognized by IUCN